Nelli Laitinen (born 29 April 2002) is a Finnish ice hockey player and member of the Finnish national team. She plays college ice hockey with the Minnesota Golden Gophers women's ice hockey program in the Western Collegiate Hockey Association (WCHA) conference of the NCAA Division I as an incoming freshman for the 2022–23 season.

Laitinen represented Finland at the IIHF Women's World Championships in 2019 and 2021. As a junior player with the Finnish national under-18 team, she participated in the IIHF U18 Women's World Championships in 2017, 2018, 2019, and 2020.

International play 
As a junior player with the Finnish national under-18 team, she participated in the IIHF U18 Women's World Championships in 2017, 2018, 2019, and 2020.

Laitinen made her senior national team debut at the 2018 4 Nations Cup in Saskatoon, Canada, where she contributed one assist in four games to Finland's bronze medal victory. Later that season, she represented Finland at the 2019 IIHF Women's World Championship. At sixteen years old, she was the youngest player on the team and 29 years younger than Finland's eldest player, Riikka Sallinen. She recorded one assist in seven games as Finland won the first World Championship silver medal in team history.

She won bronze medals representing Finland at the 2021 IIHF Women's World Championship and in the women's ice hockey tournament at the 2022 Winter Olympics in Beijing.

Personal life 
Laitinen's older brother, Villi (born 1999), plays ice hockey professionally as a defenseman with Lukko in the Finnish Liiga.

At a pre-Olympic press conference in January 2022, she confirmed that she was in a relationship with NHL player Jesperi Kotkaniemi.

Career statistics

Regular season and playoffs 
Naisten SM-sarja was rebranded as Naisten Liiga in 2017. Espoo Blues renamed as Kiekko-Espoo in 2019.

Note: Postseason results for the 2016–17 season are from the qualification series rather than the playoffs and are not calculated with playoff totals.

International

Sources: Finnish Ice Hockey Association, Elite Prospects

Honors and achievements 

Sources:

References

External links
 
 

2002 births
Living people
Espoo Blues Naiset players
Finnish expatriate ice hockey players in the United States
Finnish women's ice hockey defencemen
Ice hockey players at the 2022 Winter Olympics
Kiekko-Espoo Naiset players
Medalists at the 2022 Winter Olympics
Minnesota Golden Gophers women's ice hockey players
Olympic bronze medalists for Finland
Olympic ice hockey players of Finland
Olympic medalists in ice hockey
People from Lohja
Sportspeople from Uusimaa